The National Trust is a ten-part BBC television documentary examining various aspects of National Trust, first aired in 2005.

Among the National Trust properties presented were Studland Beach & Nature Reserve, where local residents experience severe problems with the Trust, 251 Menlove Avenue, John Lennon's boyhood home, Tyntesfield, Waddesdon Manor, and Stonehenge.

External links
 

BBC television documentaries
2005 British television series debuts
2005 British television series endings